Emiliano Buendía Stati (born 25 December 1996) is an Argentine professional footballer who plays as a winger for  club Aston Villa and the Argentina national team.

Buendía's senior career began at Getafe with whom he spent four years, including a short spell with Spanish club Cultural Leonesa, before he moved to England, joining Norwich City in 2018 and Aston Villa in 2021.

Club career

Getafe
Born in Mar del Plata, Argentina, Buendía started his career with Getafe. On 30 March 2014, still a junior, he made his senior debut, starting for the reserves in a 2–1 away win against Puerta Bonita in the Segunda División B. He scored his first goal on 13 April, with the first of a 2–0 win away to Peña Sport.

Buendía started the 2014–15 season still with the reserve team and in the third level, notably scoring twice in a 3–0 home win over Fuenlabrada. He played his first match as a professional on 5 December 2014, as a substitute for Ángel Lafita in a 3–0 home win against Eibar in the Copa del Rey.

Buendía made his La Liga debut on 1 February 2015, coming on as a late substitute in a 1–0 away loss against Almería. He scored his first goal in the same competition on 27 September, with the second in a 3–0 home win against Levante.

On 5 July 2016, despite suffering relegation with Getafe at the end of the 2015–16 La Liga season, Buendía signed a new five-year contract with the club. On 27 July 2017, he was loaned to fellow second tier club Cultural Leonesa, for one year.

Norwich City

2018–2020

On 8 June 2018, Buendía signed a four-year deal with EFL Championship club Norwich City. He scored his first goal for Norwich in a 1–0 win over Brentford on 27 October, and played an integral role as one of the main creative attacking players in the team – scoring 7 further league goals as the club swept to promotion to the Premier League and the Championship title. Fans subsequently voted him into third place in the annual Player of the Season awards.

On 8 July 2019, he signed a new five-year contract to stay at Norwich until the June 2024. During December 2019, Buendía created 29 chances for his teammates, which was the most chances created by a player in a single month in the Premier League since the stat began to be recorded in 2003–04.

On 7 July 2020, Buendía scored his first goal in the Premier League, coming in a 2–1 away defeat to Watford. Norwich would lose their next match to West Ham, a result which confirmed their relegation back to the Championship after only a single season in the top flight.

2020–21 season: Promotion and Championship POTS
On 6 April 2021, Buendía scored once and provided three assists in a 7–0 victory over Huddersfield Town. On 17 April, Norwich secured automatic promotion back into the Premier League, and secured the Championship title on 1 May with a 4–1 win over Reading.

On 29 April, following a season in which Buendía scored 15 league goals and added a further 16 assists, he won the EFL Championship Player of the Season award. He was also named as Norwich's Player of the Season, becoming only the fourth player from outside the British Isles to win the award.

Aston Villa
On 7 June 2021, it was announced that an agreement had been reached for Buendía to be transferred to fellow Premier League club Aston Villa once he had returned from international duty with Argentina. The deal was completed on 10 June. The transfer fee was believed to be worth around £33 million, rising to £38 million with potential bonuses, and was confirmed to be both Aston Villa's record signing and Norwich City's record sale.

Buendía made his debut on 14 August 2021, in a 3–2 away loss to Watford on the opening day of the 2021–22 season. He scored his first goal for Villa on 28 August 2021, in a 1–1 draw at home to Brentford in the Premier League.

International career
On 16 September 2014, Buendía was called up to the Spain under-19s. On 29 April of the following year, he was called up by Argentina under-20s for 2015 FIFA U-20 World Cup, and joined the latter's training camp on 5 May 2015. In May 2021, Buendía was called up to the Argentina senior squad for the first time. On 1 February 2022, he made his debut in a 1–0 home victory over Colombia.

Career statistics

Club

International

Honours
Getafe
Segunda División play-offs: 2017

Norwich City
EFL Championship: 2018–19, 2020–21

Individual
EFL Championship Player of the Season: 2020–21
PFA Team of the Year: 2020–21 Championship
EFL Championship Team of the Season: 2020–21
Norwich City Player of the Season: 2020–21

References

External links

Profile at the Aston Villa F.C. website

1996 births
Living people
Sportspeople from Mar del Plata
Argentine footballers
Spanish footballers
Association football midfielders
Cadetes de San Martín players
Getafe CF B players
Getafe CF footballers
Cultural Leonesa footballers
Norwich City F.C. players
Aston Villa F.C. players
Segunda División B players
La Liga players
Segunda División players
English Football League players
Premier League players
Spain youth international footballers
Argentina under-20 international footballers
Argentina international footballers
Argentine expatriate footballers
Spanish expatriate footballers
Expatriate footballers in England
Argentine expatriate sportspeople in England
Spanish expatriate sportspeople in England
Argentine emigrants to Spain